Jordan Stempleman (1977) is an American poet. Born in Kansas City, Missouri, Stempleman earned a B.A. in fiction from Columbia College Chicago (where he won the Academy of American Poets, Lannan Prize for Poetry), and a Master of Fine Arts degree in poetry from the University of Iowa Writers' Workshop (where he was a Leggett-Schupes Fellow). He co-edits (with poet Nicholas Manning) The Continental Review, one of the longest running online literary magazines devoted to video poetics, and curates A Common Sense Reading Series. He is the author of eight collections of poetry including Wallop which was published in 2015 by Magic Helicopter Press. In 2013, The Huffington Post named him one of the "top 200 advocates for American poetry." He lives in Kansas City, Missouri and teaches at the Kansas City Art Institute.

Bibliography

Wallop (Magic Helicopter Press, 2015)
No, Not Today (Magic Helicopter Press, 2011)
Doubled Over (BlazeVOX Books, 2009)
String Parade (BlazeVOX books, 2008)
The Travels (Otoliths, 2008) 
Facings (Otoliths, 2007)
What's The Matter (Otoliths, 2007)
Their Fields (Moria, 2005)

References

21st-century American poets
Poets from Missouri
Living people
1977 births
Writers from Kansas City, Missouri
Columbia College Chicago alumni
Iowa Writers' Workshop alumni
Kansas City Art Institute faculty